The Kagara Emirate is a traditional state which located in Kagara near to Pandogari town, Kagara is the capital of Rafi local  government Niger State, Nigeria. The Emirate is located in Niger East Senatorial District.

List of rulers

Kagara Emirate in the history has three rulers including the present ruler, the second emir of Kagara Alhaji Salihu Tanko, Who has died after suffering from illness. After his death the Alhaji Ahmed Garba Gunna became the third emir of Kagara. and the first Emir Attahiru Ahmadu.

History of Emirate

History of Dam in Kagara Emirate
The town has a talc processing plant.
Construction of a dam was initiated in 1979 for a sum of N5 billions.
The Federal University of Technology Minna carried out the Environmental Impact assessment for the Upper Niger River Basin and Rural Development Authority (UNRBDA).
About N3 billions had been paid by February 2002, when the Minister of Water Resources, Muktar Shagari, gave the contractor a deadline to complete the dam by December that year.
In February 2004 the Minister of State for Water Resources, Mr. Bashr Ishola Awotorebo visited the dam site, and as a result called the contractor to account for delays in the project. 
In August 2004, while presenting 500 hand pumps from the Federal Government to the Niger State Governor, Abdulkadir Kure, Mukhtar Shagari said the dam project could be doomed due to non-approval of the budgetary allocation.
In August 2007, Bala Kuta of the All Nigeria Peoples Party, a National House of Assembly representative, pledged to help with the dam project.

One student is killed and 27 students, three teachers, twelve family members) were kidnapped by bandits on 17 February 2021.

Remains of the Iron Age Nok culture have been found at Kagara, which lies at the far northwest end of the zone of Nok culture.

References

Nigerian traditional states